Aisha Masaka (born 10 November 2003) is a Tanzanian footballer who plays as a forward or a winger for BK Häcken in the Damallsvenskan and the Tanzania women's national team.

Club career
Masaka has played for Young Africans in Tanzania.

International career
Masaka capped for Tanzania at senior level during 2021 COSAFA Women's Championship.

References

External links

2003 births
Living people
People from Singida Region
Tanzanian women's footballers
Women's association football forwards
Women's association football wingers
Young Africans S.C. players
Tanzania women's international footballers
Tanzanian Premier League players